Rondelli, an Italian family name, can refer to:

People
 Giorgio Rondelli (1946–), Italian athletics coach
 Paolo Rondelli (1963–), Sammarinese politician
 Stefano "Steve" Rondelli, a gangster of Lucchese crime family

Fictional characters
 Vic Rondelli, a character from the film Silent Predators